The 1947 Walker Cup, the 11th Walker Cup Match, was played on 16 and 17 May 1947, on the Old Course at St Andrews, Scotland. The United States won by 8 matches to 4.

The match should have been played in the United States; the previous match, in 1938, having been played at St. Andrews. However, the Royal and Ancient decided that it would have been impossible to send a team to the United States. Rather than postpone the match, the USGA agreed that the match would take place in Britain.

Format
Four 36-hole matches of foursomes were played on Friday and eight singles matches on Saturday. Each of the 12 matches was worth one point in the larger team competition. If a match was all square after the 36th hole extra holes were not played. The team with most points won the competition. If the two teams were tied, the previous winner would retain the trophy.

Teams
Nine players for the United States and Great Britain & Ireland participated in the event plus one non-playing captain for each team. The U.S. team was announced in January and included Cary Middlecoff. Middlecoff immediately withdrew from the team, as he intended turning professional, and was replaced by the first reserve George Hamer. The British team was announced less than a week before the match after a series of trial matches. The United States used the same eight players on both day, Hamer being left out. For Great Britain and Ireland, Micklem was left out of the foursomes while Kyle was left out of the singles.

Great Britain & Ireland
 & 
Captain:  John Beck
 Joe Carr
 Leonard Crawley
 Cecil Ewing
 Alex Kyle
 Laddie Lucas
 Gerald Micklem
 Charlie Stowe
 Ronnie White
 James Wilson

United States

Captain: Francis Ouimet
Ted Bishop
Dick Chapman
George Hamer
Fred Kammer
Smiley Quick
Skee Riegel
Frank Stranahan
Willie Turnesa
Bud Ward

Friday's foursomes

Saturday's singles

References

Walker Cup
Golf tournaments in Scotland
Walker Cup
Walker Cup
Walker Cup